Paragon Peak is located at the southern end of Mount Robson Provincial Park on the border of Alberta and British Columbia in Canada. It was named in 1921 by Howard Palmer.

See also
 List of peaks on the British Columbia–Alberta border
 List of mountains in the Canadian Rockies

References

Three-thousanders of Alberta
Three-thousanders of British Columbia
Canadian Rockies